Weird City is an American comedy science fiction anthology streaming television series released on YouTube Premium on February 13, 2019.

Premise
Weird City is set in the near future in the city of Weird, which has been physically divided into two halves and segregated by economic class: Above The Line, populated by Haves, and Below The Line, populated by Have-Nots. Each episode follows different individuals as they navigate life in the city.

Episodes

Season 1 (2019)

Production

Development
On June 28, 2018, it was announced that YouTube had given the production a series order for a first season consisting of six episodes. Executive producers were set to include Jordan Peele, Jose Molina, Charlie Sanders, Adam Bernstein, Win Rosenfeld, Tom Lesinski, Jenna Santoianni, Sam Hansen, Jimmy Miller, Keith Raskin, and Linda Morel. Bernstein was expected to direct the first two episodes and Molina to serve as showrunner. It was reported in January 2019 that Amy Heckerling, Tricia Brock, and Adam Bernstein would serve as directors for the series with each directing two episodes.

Casting
On July 27, 2018, it was announced that guest stars in the first season would include Sara Gilbert, Dylan O'Brien, Ed O'Neill, Rosario Dawson, Michael Cera, Laverne Cox, and LeVar Burton. On January 9, 2019, it was reported that Awkwafina, Hannah Simone, Gillian Jacobs, Malcolm Barrett, Mark Hamill, Yvette Nicole Brown, Trevor Jackson, Travis Bryant and Auli’i Cravalho would also make guest appearances.

Filming
Principal photography for the series began on July 20, 2018 in the Toy District of Downtown Los Angeles, California. Filming took place at various locations around Downtown Los Angeles that week including the Calvin S. Hamilton Pedway and the Jewelry District.

Release
On January 9, 2019, the official trailer for the series was released. All six episodes of the first season were released on February 13.

Reception
The review aggregator website Rotten Tomatoes reported an 83% approval rating for the first season, with an average rating of 6.16/10 based on 23 reviews. The website's consensus reads, "A delightfully off-kilter combination of satire and science fiction, Weird City lives up to its name and then some -- even when it retreads familiar genre ground."

References

External links

English-language television shows
2019 American television series debuts
Television series set in the future
Science fiction anthology television series
YouTube Premium original series
Television series created by Jordan Peele
Dystopian web series
2010s American comic science fiction television series
2010s American satirical television series
American science fiction web series
Science fiction anthology web series
Television shows set in Los Angeles
2010s American anthology television series
Satirical web series
Dystopian television series
Social reputation in fiction